Pobeda Cinema is a cinema in Zheleznodorozhny City District of Novosibirsk, Russia. It is located at Lenin Street. The cinema was built in 1925.

History
The cinema was constructed in 1925.

In 1936, the building of the cinema was reconstructed by architect V. S. Maslennikov.

The cinema was also reconstructed in 1951 (architects: G. F. Kravtsov, B. A. Bitkin, A. P. Mordvov), 1958–1959 (architects: G. F. Kravtsov, G. P. Zilberman), 1967 and 2006.

Gallery

References

Zheleznodorozhny City District, Novosibirsk
Buildings and structures completed in 1925
Buildings and structures in Novosibirsk
Culture in Novosibirsk
Cinemas in Russia
Cultural heritage monuments of regional significance in Novosibirsk Oblast